The Man Who Liked To Look at Himself is a crime novel by the American writer K. C. Constantine set in 1970s Rocksburg, a fictional, blue-collar, Rust Belt town in Western Pennsylvania (modeled on the author's hometown of McKees Rocks, Pennsylvania, adjacent to Pittsburgh).

Mario Balzic is the protagonist, an atypical detective for the genre, a Serbo-Italian American cop, middle-aged, unpretentious, a family man who asks questions and uses more sense than force.

As the novel opens, Balzic and Lt. Harry Minyon of the state police are hunting pheasant at the Rocksburg Rod and Gun Club when, after Minyon's dog bites Balzic, the dog uncovers a piece of human bone that shows signs of having been hacked apart.

It is the second book in the 17-volume Rocksburg series.

1973 American novels
Novels by K. C. Constantine
American crime novels
Novels set in Pennsylvania
Saturday Review Press books